Veľký Krtíš District (okres Veľký Krtíš) is a district in
the Banská Bystrica Region of central Slovakia. Until 1918, the district was split between the county of Kingdom of Hungary of Hont and Nógrád.

Municipalities
Balog nad Ipľom
Bátorová
Brusník
Bušince
Čebovce
Čeláre
Čelovce
Červeňany
Chrastince
Chrťany
Dačov Lom
Dolinka
Dolná Strehová
Dolné Plachtince
Dolné Strháre
Ďurkovce
Glabušovce
Horná Strehová
Horné Plachtince
Horné Strháre
Hrušov
Ipeľské Predmostie
Kamenné Kosihy
Kiarov
Kleňany
Koláre
Kosihovce
Kosihy nad Ipľom
Kováčovce
Lesenice
Ľuboriečka
Malá Čalomija
Malé Straciny
Malé Zlievce
Malý Krtíš
Modrý Kameň
Muľa
Nenince
Nová Ves
Obeckov
Olováry
Opatovská Nová Ves
Opava
Pôtor
Pravica
Príbelce
Sečianky
Seľany
Senné
Širákov
Sklabiná
Slovenské Ďarmoty
Slovenské Kľačany
Stredné Plachtince
Sucháň
Suché Brezovo
Šuľa
Trebušovce
Veľká Čalomija
Veľká Ves nad Ipľom
Veľké Straciny
Veľké Zlievce
Veľký Krtíš
Veľký Lom
Vieska
Vinica
Vrbovka
Záhorce
Závada
Želovce
Zombor

Districts of Slovakia
Geography of Banská Bystrica Region